Nfisseh   (also Nfissé) is a  town in Akkar Governorate, Lebanon.

The population of Nfisseh is mostly Greek Orthodox Christian or Maronite.

History
In 1838, Eli Smith noted  the village as 'en-Nufeiseh,  whose inhabitants were Maronites, located east of esh-Sheikh Mohammed.

References

Bibliography

External links
Nfisseh, Localiban 

Populated places in Akkar District
Maronite Christian communities in Lebanon
Eastern Orthodox Christian communities in Lebanon